Sigmund Selberg (11 August 1910 – 20 April 1994) was a Norwegian mathematician. He was born in Langesund as the son of Ole Michael Ludvigsen Selberg and Anna Kristina Brigtsdatter Skeie. He was twin brother of Arne Selberg and brother of Henrik Selberg and Atle Selberg. He was appointed professor of mathematics at the Norwegian Institute of Technology in Trondheim from 1947 to 1977. His works mainly focused on the distribution of prime numbers.

References

1910 births
1994 deaths
People from Bamble
Academic staff of the Norwegian Institute of Technology
Norwegian twins
20th-century  Norwegian  mathematicians
Presidents of the Norwegian Mathematical Society